The Journal of Research in Science Teaching is a peer-reviewed academic journal covering science education. It was established in 1963 and is published ten times per year by John Wiley & Sons on behalf of the National Association for Research in Science Teaching, of which it is the official journal. The editors-in-chief are Troy D. Sadler (University of North Carolina) and Felicia Moore Mensah (Columbia University). According to the Journal Citation Reports, the journal has a 2020 impact factor of 4.832, ranking it 21st out of 265 journals in the category "Education & Educational Research".

References

External links

Publications established in 1963
Science education journals
Wiley (publisher) academic journals
English-language journals
10 times per year journals